Evelyn Omavowan Oboro (born 1971) is a Nigerian politician and member of the Federal House of Representative. She represented Okpe, Sapele and Uvwie constituency of Delta State in the 7th and 8th National Assembly. She was elected on the platform of the People's Democratic Party (PDP)

Education and career
She received the West Africa School Certificate at Alegbo Secondary School, Effurum in 1988 before she applied to study education in Delta State University where she obtained a Bachlor's degree in 1997. She hold a Master of Public Administration in 2002 and a degree in Law in 2009 from Delta State University.

References

Nigerian politicians
1972 births
Living people